was a Japanese football player and manager. He played for Japan national team.

Club career
Mori was born in Fukuyama on November 24, 1943. He played for Waseda University. He won 1963 and 1966 Emperor's Cup at university. After graduating from Waseda University, he joined Mitsubishi Motors (later Urawa Reds) in 1967. The club won the league champions in 1969 and 1973. The club also won 1971 and 1973 Emperor's Cup. He retired in 1977. He played 146 games and scored 28 goals in the league. He was selected Best Eleven 5 times.

National team career
In October 1964, when Mori was a Waseda University student, he was selected Japan national team for 1964 Summer Olympics in Tokyo. But he did not play in the match. On December 16, 1966, he debuted against Singapore at 1966 Asian Games. In 1968, he was selected Japan for 1968 Summer Olympics in Mexico City. He played in all matches and Japan won bronze medal. In 2018, this team was selected Japan Football Hall of Fame. In 1970, he also played at 1970 Asian Games. He played 56 games and scored 2 goals for Japan until 1976.

Coaching career
After retirement, in November 1980, Mori became a coach for Japan national team under new manager Saburo Kawabuchi. Mori was promoted to manager in April 1981. He managed at 1982 Asian Games and 1984 Summer Olympics qualification. At 1986 World Cup qualification in 1985, Japan defeated Singapore, North Korea and Hong Kong to reach the final round of the East Asian zone to play South Korea. Japan lost 1–3 on aggregate. Mori then led the team to the 1986 Asian Games in Seoul and resigned following the team's failure to reach the second round. In 1992, Mori became a manager for Urawa Reds. However, Urawa Reds finished at the bottom place in J1 League first season and he resigned. In 1998, he signed with Avispa Fukuoka and he managed the club in 1 season.

In 2006, Mori was selected to the Japan Football Hall of Fame. On July 17, 2011, he died of renal pelvis cancer in Meguro, Tokyo at the age of 67. That day was the day Japan women's national team won 2011 Women's World Cup, Japan won the world champions for the first time through men and women.

Club statistics

National team statistics

Managerial statistics

Awards
 Japan Soccer League Best Eleven: (5) 1969, 1970, 1973, 1974, 1975

References

External links

 
 Japan National Football Team Database

Japan Football Hall of Fame at Japan Football Association
Japan Football Hall of Fame (Japan team at 1968 Olympics) at Japan Football Association

1943 births
2011 deaths
Waseda University alumni
Association football people from Hiroshima Prefecture
Japanese footballers
Japan international footballers
Japan Soccer League players
Urawa Red Diamonds players
Japanese football managers
Japan national football team managers
J1 League managers
Urawa Red Diamonds managers
Avispa Fukuoka managers
Olympic footballers of Japan
Olympic medalists in football
Olympic bronze medalists for Japan
Medalists at the 1968 Summer Olympics
Footballers at the 1964 Summer Olympics
Footballers at the 1968 Summer Olympics
Asian Games medalists in football
Asian Games bronze medalists for Japan
Footballers at the 1966 Asian Games
Footballers at the 1970 Asian Games
Association football defenders
Medalists at the 1966 Asian Games